Pentire (meaning promontory) is a farm near St Eval in Cornwall, England. On the coast nearby is Pentire Steps.

It should not be confused with Pentire, a western suburb of Newquay (grid ref. SW7961).

See also

 List of farms in Cornwall

References

Farms in Cornwall